Light Thickens is a detective novel by Ngaio Marsh; it is the thirty-second, and final, novel to feature Roderick Alleyn, and was first published in 1982.  The plot concerns the murder of the lead actor in a production of Macbeth in London, and the novel takes its title from a line in the play. A number of characters in the book appeared previously in Marsh's novel Death at the Dolphin. The novel is dedicated to the actors James Laurenson and Helen Thomas who had played Macbeth and Lady Macbeth, respectively, in the author's 1962 production of the play, which she had previously directed, also for The Canterbury University Players, in 1946.

The subject was close to the author's heart. In 1981, she wrote to her close friends Maureen (née Rhodes) and John Balfour that the novel had been in her mind for a long time, was "hell" to write and would, she thought, appeal to theatre people rather than to her usual fans. Her characteristic modesty proved wrong, as the novel sold extremely well, receiving especially favourable reviews in the US. Her biographer describes the novel as effectively Ngaio Marsh's third production of the play.

Like Shakespeare's play, Light Thickens is gory and dramatic, but apart from the traditional murder mystery at its centre, and its use of the theatrical superstitions surrounding "The Scots Play" (a title her publishers favoured at one point), the book describes in absorbing detail the rehearsal, production and run of a "flawless" production, with the backstage tensions and theatrical detail conveyed with all the author's style, verve and experience. Especially intriguing, among her usual dramatis personae of suspects, including the grandly arrogant leading man and gracious leading lady, are the characters of two actors - Rangi, the young Maori who plays one of the witches, and Gaston Sears, the obsessive fight director who also plays Seyton. Marsh fans enjoy meeting again the director Peregrine Jay and his wife Emily (now parents), Jeremy Jones and the management of the Dolphin Theatre from her 1966 Death at the Dolphin, and observing how the theatre world she describes has changed from her earlier backstage novels of the 1930s-1950s. In Light Thickens she shows management dealing with chaperonage of young performers, union rules and Equity representatives, a left-wing, agit-prop politico within the cast, and so on.

References

Roderick Alleyn novels
1982 British novels
Novels about actors
Novels set in London
Macbeth
Collins Crime Club books